Cho Yu-min (born 17 November 1996) is a South Korean football centre-back or defensive midfielder who plays for Daejeon Hana Citizen and the South Korea national team.

Club career

International career

Career statistics

Club
As of 11 March 2023

Personal life 
On 18 January 2022 it was confirmed that Cho and South Korean singer Park So-yeon are getting married after 3 years of dating. The wedding will be held in November, when Cho's season ends.

Later, it was announced the wedding ceremony in November has been postponed until next year, due to Cho joining the national team and is planning to focus for the 2022 FIFA Qatar World Cup. However, the couple had already registered their marriage and is already a legal couple.

References

External links 
 

1996 births
Living people
Association football midfielders
South Korean footballers
Suwon FC players
K League 2 players
Footballers at the 2018 Asian Games
Asian Games medalists in football
Asian Games gold medalists for South Korea
Medalists at the 2018 Asian Games
South Korea under-23 international footballers
Chung-Ang University alumni
2022 FIFA World Cup players